Rainbow Mist is an album by the American jazz saxophonist Coleman Hawkins compiling recordings from 1944 originally released by Apollo Records that was released by the Delmark label in 1992.

Reception

Allmusic reviewer Scott Yanow stated "For his recording session of February 16, 1944, the great tenor invited some of the most promising younger players (including trumpeter Dizzy Gillespie, bassist Oscar Pettiford, and drummer Max Roach) and the result was the very first bebop on records. ... Also on this highly recommended CD are four titles matching together the tenors of Hawkins, Ben Webster, and Georgie Auld (with trumpeter Charlie Shavers included as a bonus) and a session from Auld's big band, highlighted by Sonny Berman's trumpet solo".

Track listing
 "Rainbow Mist" (Coleman Hawkins) – 2:55
 "Woody 'n' You" (Dizzy Gillespie) – 2:57
 "Bu-Dee-Daht" (Budd Johnson, Charlie Hart) – 3:10
 "Disorder at the Border" (Hawkins) – 2:54
 "Yesterdays" (Jerome Kern, Otto Harbach) – 2:53	
 "Feeling Zero" (Hawkins) – 2:55
 "Salt Peanuts" (Gillespie, Kenny Clarke) – 2:53	
 "Uptown Lullaby" (Leonard Feather) – 3:17
 "Pick-Up Boys" (Feather) – 2:59
 "Porgy" (Jimmy McHugh, Dorothy Fields) – 3:00
 "Concerto for Tenor" (Johnson) – 3:13
 "Taps Miller" (Count Basie) – 3:08
 "I Can't Get Started" (Vernon Duke, Ira Gershwin) – 4:30
 "Sweet and Lovely" (Gus Arnheim, Jules LeMare, Harry Tobias) – 3:08

Personnel
Coleman Hawkins - tenor saxophone (tracks 1-10)
Tracks 1-6: Coleman Hawkins & His Orchestra:
Dizzy Gillespie, Ed Vandever Vic Coulson – trumpet
Leo Parker, Leonard Lowry – alto saxophone 
Don Byas, Ray Abrams – tenor saxophone
Budd Johnson – tenor saxophone, baritone saxophone
Clyde Hart – piano
Oscar Pettiford – bass
Max Roach – drums
Recorded in New York City on February 16, 1944 (tracks 2, 3 & 5) and February 22, 1944 (tracks 1, 4 & 6)Tracks 7-10: Auld/Hawkins/Webster Sextet:Charlie Shavers – trumpet
Georgie Auld – alto saxophone, soprano saxophone, tenor saxophone
Ben Webster – tenor saxophone, clarinet
Bill Rowland – piano
Hy White – guitar
Israel Crosby – bass 
Specs Powell – drums
Recorded in New York City on May 17, 1944Tracks 11-14: Georgie Auld and His Orchestra:''
Georgie Auld – alto saxophone, soprano saxophone, tenor saxophone
Sonny Berman, Manny Fox, Howard McGhee, George Schwartz – trumpet
Bobby Lord, Rudy De Luca, Jerry Dorn – trombone
Musky Ruffo, Gene Zanoni – alto saxophone
Al Cohn, Irv Roth – tenor saxophone
Irv Green – baritone saxophone
Harry Biss – piano
Morris Rayman – bass 
Lou Fromm –  drums 
Kay Little – vocals (track 14)
Recorded in New York City on May 22, 1944

References

Delmark Records albums
1992 albums
Coleman Hawkins albums
Albums produced by Bob Koester